Hugh Alexander Kennedy (22 August 1809 – 22 October 1878) was an English chess master and writer.

Chess career
Hugh Alexander Kennedy was born in Madras, British India in 1809. He was a British army captain and leading London chess player.  He established the first chess club in Brighton in 1842. In 1844, he lost a match to Howard Staunton (3–8). In 1845, he teamed up with Staunton in Portsmouth in two telegraph games (lost and drew) against a team of Henry Thomas Buckle, George Walker, William Davies Evans, Perigal, and Tuckett in London. He lost a match to Elijah Williams (+2−4=0) in 1846 and lost a match to Edward Löwe (+6−7=1) in 1849, both in London.

Kennedy played in the great international London 1851 chess tournament and finished in sixth place of the sixteen competitors. He knocked out Carl Mayet in round 1 with two wins. In round 2, he lost to Marmaduke Wyvill (+3−4=1).  In round 3, he defeated James Mucklow with four wins.  Finally, he lost to József Szén (+0−4=1).

In 1862, Kennedy lost perhaps the first international telegraphic game, against Serafino Dubois.

Kennedy died in Reading, England, in 1878.

"Napoleon" game
In the story "Some Reminiscences of the Life of Augustus Fitzsnob, Esq." (inspired by Thackeray's The Book of Snobs), Kennedy gave the score of a chess game said to be played by Napoleon and Count Bertrand. First published in 1860, it was later included in Waifs and Strays (2nd edition, 1876), a collection of Kennedy's writings. It has been erroneously cited as a true Napoleon game many times since, although it is actually the score of a game between Kennedy and John Owen.

This is the score given by Kennedy in the two-column notation that was common at the time, and in modern algebraic notation.

{| class="wikitable" width=500
|- align=center
| Napoleon || Bertrand || Algebraic notation
|-
|  1. P to K fourth     ||  1. P to K fourth          || 1. e4 e5
|-
|  2. Kt to K B third   ||  2. Kt to Q B third        || 2. Nf3 Nc6
|-
|  3. P to Q fourth     ||  3. Kt takes P             || 3. d4 Nxd4
|-
|  4. Kt takes Kt       ||  4. P takes Kt             || 4. Nxd4 exd4
|-
|  5. K B to Q B fourth ||  5. K B to Q B fourth      || 5. Bc4 Bc5
|-
|  6. P to Q B third    ||  6. Q to K second          || 6. c3 Qe7
|-
|  7. Castles           ||  7. Q to K fourth          || 7. 0-0 Qe5
|-
|  8. P to K B fourth   ||  8. P takes P (dis. check) || 8. f4 dxc3+
|-
|  9. K to R square     ||  9. P takes P              || 9. Kh1 cxb2
|-
| 10. B takes K B P (check)  || 10. K to Q square               || 10. Bxf7+ Kd8
|-
| 11. P takes Q              || 11. P takes R (Queening)        || 11. fxe5 bxa1=Q
|-
| 12. B takes Kt             || 12. K B to K second             || 12. Bxg8 Be7
|-
| 13. Q to Q Kt third        || 13. P to Q R fourth *           || 13. Qb3 a5
|-
| colspan=3 align=center | And Napoleon forces mate in five moves (see diagram)
|}

* Kennedy writes of Black's thirteenth move: "This seems a courtier-like move on the part of Count Bertrand. He ought now have taken P at K fifth with Q, having the exchange and two Pawns in return for a formidable attack."

Writings

References

Further reading
 The Times, 28 October 1878, p. 1. c. 1
 British Chess Magazine, 1878, p. 473
 Chess Player's Chronicle, 1878, pp. 270–271

External links

1809 births
1878 deaths
English chess players
British chess writers
Sportspeople from London
19th-century chess players